The Anacostia Freeway is a freeway in the U.S. state of Maryland and the District of Columbia. It follows:
Interstate 295 (Maryland–District of Columbia), a spur route connecting I-95 / I-495 and Maryland Route 210 (Indian Head Highway) near the Potomac River
District of Columbia Route 295, a freeway in the District of Columbia

Interstate 95
Roads in Washington, D.C.